Óscar Miñambres Pascual (born 1 January 1981) is a Spanish retired footballer.

He could operate as either a defender or midfielder on the right side, and had his professional career marred by constant injuries. He appeared in 37 competitive games for Real Madrid.

Club career

Real Madrid
A product of Real Madrid's youth academy, Miñambres was born in Fuenlabrada, Community of Madrid, and first appeared with the first team on 10 February 2002, playing 90 minutes in a 7–0 home thrashing of UD Las Palmas in his sole La Liga appearance of the season. He would also make his UEFA Champions League debut that year, appearing against FC Porto and setting up a goal for Santiago Solari in a 2–1 second group phase away win.

After years of battling with injuries and a loan at fellow league side RCD Espanyol in the 2004–05 campaign, Miñambres became a free agent after Real Madrid did not offer him a new deal.

Hércules
On 8 August 2007, Marca officially announced that Miñambres would play the next three years with Segunda División's Hércules CF. The following day, however, he terminated his contract with the club because his knee was not fully recovered, and he immediately retired from football.

Honours
Real Madrid
La Liga: 2002–03
UEFA Champions League: 2001–02
Intercontinental Cup: 2002

References

External links

1981 births
Living people
People from Fuenlabrada
Spanish footballers
Footballers from the Community of Madrid
Association football defenders
Association football midfielders
La Liga players
Segunda División B players
Real Madrid C footballers
Real Madrid Castilla footballers
Real Madrid CF players
RCD Espanyol footballers
Hércules CF players
UEFA Champions League winning players
Spain under-21 international footballers